Karl-Heinz Stahr (born 5 June 1950) is a retired East German featherweight freestyle wrestler who won a silver medal at the 1973 World Championships. He started as a gymnast and then changed to wrestling. After retiring from competitions he ran a car service in Luckenwalde.

References

1950 births
Living people
German male sport wrestlers
World Wrestling Championships medalists
People from Treuenbrietzen
Sportspeople from Brandenburg